Gartow is a municipality in the district Lüchow-Dannenberg, in Lower Saxony, Germany. It is situated in the easternmost tip of Lower Saxony, not far from the river Elbe, approx. 30 km northeast of Salzwedel, and 20 km west of Wittenberge. Gartow is also the seat of the Samtgemeinde ("collective municipality") Gartow.

Geography 
Gartow is located in the historical region Wendland, at the west shore of the river Seege, which is artificially formed to the Gartower See.

Points of interest 
At Gartow, there is a facility for FM- and TV-transmission, with two over 300 metre tall guyed masts, the Gartow-Höhbeck transmitter. On August 20, 2009 the smaller mast has been demolished with explosives. Until the German reunification this transmitter was also used for the directional radio link to former West-Berlin (counter station: Richtfunkstelle Berlin-Frohnau).

Nearby Gorleben is a proposed deposit for nuclear waste. This led to much controversy and protests in the area.

References

Lüchow-Dannenberg